Low-Income Countries Under Stress (LICUS) is a World Bank program aimed at poverty reduction in developing countries.

References
 Low-Income Countries Under Stress (LICUS): A World Bank Program, by Karen L. Helgeson.

World Bank